The Velankanni Matriculation And Higher Secondary School at Ashok Nagar is one of the school campuses of the St. Joseph's Educational Society.  The Velankanni Matriculation Higher Secondary Schools have facilities to educate students from L.K.G to Standard 12.

History 
The school was founded in 1975 by SRI.S.Santhanamuthu. The St. Joseph Educational Society now has four institutions in Chennai (Madras).
 Velankanni Matriculation and Higher Secondary School, Ashok Nagar
 Velankanni Matriculation and Higher Secondary School, Kodungaiyur
 Peace On Green Earth Public School, Kundrathur 
 Velankanni Nursery and Primary School, K.K.Nagar
 Velankanni Public School, Kodungaiyur

Infrastructure 
The school is located in the heart of Ashok Nagar, which facilitates a better connection to the city of Chennai. There are two main buildings divided for both primary and secondary classes. There is a separate corridor for the kindergarten and primary students. The school has a basketball court (open air) and a volleyball ground. Well-spaced classrooms have good air circulation and safety features.

Features  
 Scholarships for needy students
 Coaching class for slow learners
 Night study
 Frequent Test Series
 Multimedia Labs
 Computer Science labs
 Chemical Science Laboratory
 Physical Science Laboratory
 Small localised Canteen

The School serves 3200 students taught by 104 teachers. It is affiliated to the State Board of Secondary Education, Tamil Nadu and prepares the students for the Matriculation and Tamil Nadu State Board Secondary Examinations also known as board exams. The school is managed by the St. Joseph's Educational Society.

Co-curricular and extracurricular activities 
The students have access to clubs such as:
 Volleyball
 Basketball
 Rugby
 Badminton
 Kho-kho
 Hockey

Students are placed in one of the four houses:
 Red
 Yellow
 Blue
 Green 
The School is known for its numerous cultural, arts and inter-school talent competitions that is held each year where numerous schools from Chennai participate. 
Various talent development activities such as music classes, drawing classes, sports coaching and many more activities are encouraged in the school.

Chief Academic Management Panel 
The Academic Governing body consists of a Correspondent, one Senior Principal and one headmistress for the primary section.
 Founder and Correspondent: SRI.S.Santhamuthu.,B.Com
 Senior Principal: Mrs. Priscilla
 Headmistress: Mrs.Usha Satheesh

There are several students of the school who have represented Chennai city in state level basketball tournaments. The school has won state sports awards in basketball, volleyball, cricket, kabadi and athletics.

The School is known for its numerous cultural, arts and inter-school talents competitions that is held each year where numerous school form Chennai participate.

Notes

From 24 October 2012, new cbse school was started at kundrathur named as PEACE ON GREEN EARTH PUBLIC SCHOOL(CBSE).

References
Hindu.com
School home page

Primary schools in Tamil Nadu
High schools and secondary schools in Chennai
Educational institutions established in 1975
1975 establishments in Tamil Nadu